Ulger (Russian:Ульгэр) theater is a puppet theater in the city of Ulan-Ude, Buryatia, Russia.

It was founded in 1967. Repertoire: classic tales of the world, Russian fairy tales and plays for children written by Buryat playwrights and writers. Performances are in the Russian and Buryat languages.

References

Theatres in Ulan-Ude
Puppet theaters